Julia (c. 130 BC – 69 BC) was the wife of the Roman consul Gaius Marius and a paternal aunt of future Roman dictator Julius Caesar.

Biography
Julia was the daughter of Gaius Julius Caesar and Marcia (daughter of praetor Quintus Marcius Rex). She was a sister of Gaius Julius Caesar (the father of Julius Caesar) and Sextus Julius Caesar, consul in 91 BC.

At about 110 BC she married Gaius Marius. They had a son, Gaius Marius the Younger. Plutarch also mentions that Marius had two step-sons named Quintus Granius and Gnaeus Granius, it is possible that these men were children of Julia by an earlier marriage or step-children of Marius from a marriage to another woman before Julia. If Quintus and Gnaeus were indeed Julia's sons, then her earlier husband was likely a member of the Campanian trading family since Julia was a Patrician and would only have married someone from the Grania gens if they were very rich.

According to Plutarch, it was by marrying her, a patrician woman, that the upstart Marius got the attention of the snobbish Roman Senate and launched his political career. Julia is remembered as a virtuous woman devoted to her husband and their only child. Her reputation alone permitted her to keep her status, even after Sulla's persecutions against Marius himself and his allies.

Julia died in 69 BC and received a devoted funeral eulogy from her nephew Julius Caesar.

See also
 Women of the Julii Caesares
 Julia gens
 Julii Caesares
 Julio-Claudian family tree

References

Sources
 Plutarch, Parallel Lives, written approx. 75 CE:
"(The Life of) (Gaius) Marius"
 John Dryden translation at MIT classics
 Stewart/Long translation at Project Gutenberg
 Bernadotte Perrin (ed.) translation at LacusCurtius
"(The Life of) (Julius) Caesar"
John Dryden translation at MIT classics
Stewart/Long translation at Project Gutenberg
Bernadotte Perrin (ed.) translation at LacusCurtius
Bernadotte Perrin (ed.) translation at Perseus project
Thomas North (ed.) translation at Perseus project

External links 

 Livius.org: Julia

130s BC births
69 BC deaths
2nd-century BC Roman women
1st-century BC Roman women
1st-century BC Romans
Julii Caesares